Alexander Bone is a British saxophonist, record producer and composer. In March 2014, he won the inaugural BBC Young Musician - Jazz Award, where he performed with the Gwilym Simcock Trio. He has performed as a soloist twice on the BBC Proms, including the Last Night of the Proms.

He has worked closely with various artists as a performer, producer and arranger, including Nile Rodgers, Rudimental, Liane Carroll, Newton Faulkner, MIKA and David Newton.

Early life
Bone began playing piano at the age of two and saxophone at the age of six. He was taught saxophone by his father and attained musical experience on his parents music course 'Groovin High' and through busking, notably at the Edinburgh Fringe Festival. During this time, he played with established musicians including Stan Tracey and Snake Davis. At the age of eleven, he received his first diploma (DipLCM) in saxophone, making him one of the youngest people to achieve this in the UK. By the age of eighteen, he had received three more diplomas in saxophone - ALCM, LLCM and the Fellowship Diploma (FLCM).

At age thirteen, he passed his grade 8 jazz piano with a distinction before he was awarded a place to attend Chetham's School of Music in Manchester. Here, he studied with Iain Dixon, Les Chisnall, Steve Berry and Richard Iles. He also began teaching himself electronic music production in his spare time.

He was one of three British musicians selected to attend the Brubeck Institute Summer Jazz Colony, which took place at the University of the Pacific in August 2014.

In September 2015, Bone moved to London to study jazz saxophone at the Royal Academy of Music in London.

Career 
In March 2014, he performed in the inaugural final of the BBC Young Musician - Jazz Award competition in Cardiff to a judging panel consisting of Django Bates, Trish Clowes, Jason Yarde, and Julian Joseph. He was crowned the winner. The final was broadcast on BBC Four and BBC Radio 3.

At this time, he also had remixes released under his electronic music alias "Boney" on Spinnin' Records and Freemaison Records. In 2015, he remixed "100 Degrees" by Kylie Minogue and Dannii Minogue, released on Parlophone Records.

In September 2015, he performed on the Last Night of the Proms in Swansea with the BBC National Orchestra of Wales, playing his own arrangements of "Ain't Nobody" and "Pure Imagination", orchestrated by Simon Hale. This was broadcast live on BBC Two.

In 2016, he was won the 'Rising Star' award in the British Jazz Awards by public vote.

In 2018 he performed for the second time at the BBC Proms as part of the BBC Young Musician Prom at the Royal Albert Hall. Other soloists included Sheku Kanneh-Mason and Nicola Benedetti.

Alexander regularly performs with his own bands at venues and festivals across the UK and Europe including London Jazz Festival, Ronnie Scott's, Manchester Jazz Festival and London Saxophone Festival. In 2018, the ‘Alexander Bone Quartet’ toured the Czech Republic for two weeks.

References

External links
 Official website

English jazz alto saxophonists
British male saxophonists
English jazz pianists
English record producers
Living people
British electronic musicians
1996 births
Remixers
People from Darlington
People educated at Chetham's School of Music
21st-century saxophonists
British male pianists
21st-century pianists
21st-century British male musicians
British male jazz musicians